Stenoglene plagiatus is a moth of the  family Eupterotidae. It can be found in the Central African Republic, the Democratic Republic of Congo and Ghana.

References

Moths described in 1911
Janinae
Insects of the Democratic Republic of the Congo
Insects of West Africa
Fauna of the Central African Republic
Moths of Africa